The following is a list of the 19 cantons of the Savoie department, in France, following the French canton reorganisation which came into effect in March 2015:

 Aix-les-Bains-1
 Aix-les-Bains-2
 Albertville-1
 Albertville-2
 Bourg-Saint-Maurice
 Bugey savoyard
 Chambéry-1
 Chambéry-2
 Chambéry-3
 Modane
 Montmélian
 La Motte-Servolex
 Moûtiers
 Le Pont-de-Beauvoisin
 La Ravoire
 Saint-Alban-Leysse
 Saint-Jean-de-Maurienne
 Saint-Pierre-d'Albigny
 Ugine

References